Leiognathus berbis, the Berber ponyfish, is a species of marine ray-finned fish, a ponyfish from the family Leiognathidae. It is found in brackish and marine waters in the Indian and Pacific Oceans from the Red Sea, Gulf of Aden and Zanzibar east in the Indian Ocean to south-east Asia. Like its relatives, the fish is a demersal species that feeds on small crustaceans and bivalves. Equula berbis is considered by some authorities to be nomen dubium with the taxon it is assigned to being of uncertain placement beyond the family level,  the name being thought to probably be a junior synonym of Equulites oblongus.

References

Classification

Fish of the Pacific Ocean
Fish of the Indian Ocean
Bioluminescent fish
Fish described in 1835
berbis